The BAFTA Award for Outstanding Debut by a British Writer, Director or Producer is presented annually at the British Academy Film Awards in London. The British Academy of Film and Television Arts (BAFTA), is a British organisation that hosts annual awards shows for film, television, children's film and television, and interactive media. The Outstanding Debut award recognises the work of writers, directors and producers whose first films have been released in cinemas during the award's qualification window. It is presented in honour of screenwriter and producer Carl Foreman.

 From 1998 to 2000, this category was known as the Carl Foreman Award for Most Promising Newcomer in British Film (and was presented to a writer, director or producer).
 From 2001 to 2008, this category was known as the Carl Foreman Award for Special Achievement by a British Director, Writer or Producer in their first Feature Film.
 From 2009–present, this category has been known by its current name of Outstanding Debut by a British Writer, Director or Producer.

Jury Process
Unlike many of the other BAFTA Awards, which are decided by a membership vote, the Outstanding Debut Award's nominees and winner are decided by a jury of industry experts who view and consider eligible films over the course of the year. The jury can choose to nominate any combination of debut writer, director or producer involved in a film.

The jury has been chaired by Prof. Anthony Mellows (1999–2009), Simon Relph (2009–2012), and Stephen Woolley (2012–2016).
Jury members in recent years have included (former winner) Asif Kapadia, Peter Bradshaw, Jane Goldman, Peter Straughan, James Watkins, Joe Cornish, and Moira Buffini.

History
The first version of the award was established by the Foreman Williams Jones Foundation in 1991. Scholarships were awarded to promising British students to study filmmaking in the United States.

The present version of the award was initiated by the Foundation in 1997 and was conducted jointly by the Foundation and by BAFTA until 2009. It was established to encourage British filmmaking by recognising the most promising British newcomer in the selected disciplines of screenwriting, producing or directing (or in more than one of these disciplines). The first award of the present version was made in respect of 1998. In 2009, the name of the award was changed, and it is now solely administered by BAFTA. The award continues to be presented in honour of Carl Foreman.

Winners and nominees

1990s
Carl Foreman Award for Most Promising Newcomer in British Film

2000s

Carl Foreman Award for Special Achievement by a British Director, Writer or Producer in their first Feature Film

Outstanding Debut by a British Writer, Director or Producer

2010s

2020s

See also
From 1952–1984, a separate Newcomer Award for performers was presented. For a full list of winners and nominees in this category, see BAFTA Award for Most Promising Newcomer to Leading Film Roles.

Since 2006, a separate Newcomer Award for performers presented annually as Rising Star Award. For a full list of winners and nominees in this category, see BAFTA Rising Star Award.

Notes

British Academy Film Awards
 
Directorial debut film awards
Screenwriting awards for film